A list of the heritage-listed sites in West End, City of Brisbane, Queensland, Australia.

 19 Bank Street: Astrea
 96 Boundary Street: West End Police Station
 111 Boundary Street: Peters Factory
 137 Boundary Street: Boundary Hotel
 141 Boundary Street: Westella
 142 Boundary Street: Shop
 173 Boundary Street: Pearsons Buildings
 178 Boundary Road: Kurilpa Library
 197 Boundary Street: Row of shops
 219 Boundary Street: Timber cottage
 223 Boundary Street: Glen Finn Villa
 225 Boundary Street: Greek Evangelical Church
 227 Boundary Street: Timber-and-tin residence
 235 Boundary Street: Gorman Brothers Grocery Store
 253 Boundary Street: Bungalow style residence
 Dornoch Terrace: Dornoch Terrace Bridge
 19 Dornoch Terrace: former Methodist Church
 22 Dornoch Terrace: Flamingo House
 47 Dornoch Terrace: St Francis School & Church
 51 Dornoch Terrace: St Francis Convent
 59 Dornoch Terrace: St Francis Presbytery
 12 Exeter Street: Two-storey brick terrace house
 9 Gray Road: House "Hillside"
 15 Gray Road: Wanda Walha
 37 Gray Road: Nassagaweya
 31 Hardgrave Road: Drayton Court
 61 Hardgrave Road: Rialto Theatre 
 68 Hill end Terrace: Orleigh Park
 22 Jane Street: Walmar
 18 Mitchell Street: Hill End Child Care Centre (former church)
 222 Montague Road: former Stronach's Workshop
 277 Montague Road: Davies Park
 277 Montague Road: Gas Stripping Tower
 317 Montague Road: West End Gasworks Distribution Centre
 321 Montague Road: West End Gasworks
 406 Montague Road: Thomas Dixon Centre
 439 Montague Road: former Dixon's Tannery
 12 Princhester Street: Islamic Centre of West End
 14 Sussex Street: Carnoch
 16 Sussex Street: Norwich
 30 Sussex Street: Brighton Terrace
 24 Vulture Street: West End State School
 61 Vulture Street: Shop and Residence
 79 Vulture Street: former Marshalls Butchers
 113 Vulture Street: West End Uniting Church & Hall

References 

Heritage
West End
Heritage of West End